The 1928 All-Ireland Junior Hurling Championship was the 11th staging of the All-Ireland Junior Championship since its establishment by the Gaelic Athletic Association in 1912.

Meath entered the championship as the defending champions, however, they were beaten in the Leinster Championship.

The All-Ireland final was played on 5 May 1929 at Waterford Sportsfield, between Kilkenny and Tipperary, in what was their first meeting in a final since 1913. Kilkenny won the match by 4-06 to 4-04 to claim their first ever championship title.

Results

All-Ireland Junior Hurling Championship

All-Ireland semi-finals

All-Ireland final

References

Junior
All-Ireland Junior Hurling Championship